Carel Sirardus Willem, Count van Hogendorp (15 August 1788 – 29 October 1856) was acting Governor-General of the Dutch East Indies in 1840–1841.

Bibliography 
 1837: Tafereelen van Javaansche zeden (Scenes of Javanese mores)

References

External links 
 

1788 births
1856 deaths
Dutch military commanders of the Napoleonic Wars 
Governors-General of the Dutch East Indies
People from Murshidabad district
Royal Netherlands Army officers